Mit Jayenge Mitane Wale is a 1987 Bollywood film.

Cast
Dharmendra
Govinda
Neelam
Krishna A. R.
Danny Denzongpa
Vijayata Pandit

Soundtrack

External links
 

1987 films
1980s Hindi-language films